The [α/Fe] versus [Fe/H] diagram refers to the graph, commonly used in stellar and galactic astrophysics, which shows the logarithmic ratio number densities of diagnostic elements in stellar atmospheres compared to the solar value. The x-axis shows the abundance of elements iron (Fe) vs. hydrogen (H), that is, [Fe/H]. The y-axis shows the combination of one or several of the alpha process elements (O, Ne, Mg, Si, S, Ar, Ca, and Ti) compared to iron (Fe), that is, [α/Fe].

These diagrams allow one to assess the nucleosynthesis channels and Galactic evolution of samples of stars to first order and are one of the most commonly used tools of Galactic population analysis of our Milky Way. The diagrams are using abundance ratios that are normalised to the Sun (placing the Sun at (0,0) in the diagram) and allow to easily identify stars of the Galactic stellar high-alpha disk (historically known as the Galactic stellar thick disk) via their typically enhanced in [α/Fe] and stars of the Galactic stellar low-alpha disk (historically known as the Galactic stellar thin disk) having [α/Fe] as low as the Sun. It further allows to identify stars that are likely born at times or in environments very different to the stellar disk, typically metal-poor stars (with low [Fe/H] < -1) which likely belong to the stellar halo or accreted features.

History 
George Wallerstein and Beatrice Tinsley were early users of the [α/Fe] vs. [Fe/H] diagrams. In 1962 George Wallerstein noted, based on the analysis of a sample of 34 Galactic field stars, that "the [α/Fe] distribution seems to consist of a normal distribution about zero, plus seven stars with [α/Fe] > 0.20. These may be called [α/Fe]-rich stars."

In 1979 Beatrice Tinsley used the interpretation of these observations with the theory throughout her work on Stellar lifetimes and abundance ratios in chemical evolution. While discussing oxygen as one of the alpha process elements she wrote, "As anticipated, the observed [O/Fe] excess in metal-poor stars can be explained qualitatively if much of the iron comes from SN I. [...] The essential ingredient in accounting for the [O/Fe] excess is that a significant fraction of oxygen must come from stars with shorter lives than those that make much of the iron." In 1980 in Evolution of the Stars and Gas in Galaxies she said, "Relative abundances of elements heavier than helium provide information on both nucleosynthesis and galactic evolution [...]."

These relative abundances and the diagrams depicting different relative abundances are now among the most commonly used diagnostic tools of Galactic Archaeology. Bensby et al. (2014) used them to explore the Milky Way disk in the solar neighbourhood. Hayden et al. (2015) used them for their work on the chemical cartography of our Milky Way disk. It has been suggested that the diagram be named for Tinsley and Wallerstein.

Notation 
The diagram depicts two astrophysical quantities of stars, their iron abundance relative to hydrogen [Fe/H] - a tracer of stellar metallicity - and the enrichment of alpha process elements relative to iron, [α/Fe].

The iron abundance is noted as the logarithm of the ratio of a star's iron abundance compared to that of the Sun:

,

It is a tracing the contributions of galactic chemical evolution to the nucleosynthesis of iron. These differ for the birth environments of stars, based on their star formation history and star burst strengths. Major syntheses channels of iron are supernovae Ia and II.

The ratio of alpha process elements to iron, also known as the alpha-enhancement, is written as the logarithm of the alpha process elements O, Ne, Mg, Si, S, Ar, Ca, and Ti to Fe compared to that of the Sun:

 and

In practise, not all of these elements can be measured in stellar spectra and the alpha-enhancement is therefore commonly reported as a simple or error-weighted average of the individual alpha process element abundances.

References 

Diagrams
Comparisons